Millosevichite is a rare sulfate mineral with the chemical formula Al2(SO4)3. Aluminium is often substituted by iron. It forms finely crystalline and often porous masses.

It was first described in 1913 for an occurrence in Grotta dell'Allume, Porto Levante, Vulcano Island, Lipari, Aeolian Islands, Sicily. It was named for Italian mineralogist Federico Millosevich (1875–1942) of the University of Rome.

The mineral is mainly known from burning coal dumps, acting as one of the main minerals forming sulfate crust. It can be also found in volcanic solfatara environments.
It occurs with native sulfur, sal ammoniac, letovicite, alunogen and boussingaultite.

References 

Sulfate minerals
Trigonal minerals
Minerals in space group 148